Leo Francis McKendry  (born 1934) is a former local politician in the Marlborough Region of New Zealand. He was the 31st and last Mayor of Blenheim (1986–1989), and the 1st Mayor of Marlborough (1989–1995).

Political career
McKendry first became a councillor for Blenheim Borough in 1980, serving for one three-year term. In the 1986 local election, he was elected Mayor of Blenheim. He was the 31st and last holder of that position, as the 1989 local government reforms resulted in the amalgamation of Blenheim Borough with Picton Borough and Marlborough County Council to form Marlborough District.

McKendry was then elected the first Mayor of Marlborough and served for two terms (1989–1995). Early in the campaign for the 2010 local election, he stated that past mayors should not stand again as councillors, saying, "I've just always believed it was an unwritten rule once you were defeated or retired, it was time to go completely". Subsequently, Liz Davidson, Gerald Hope, and Tom Harrison, the three mayors who succeeded him, all failed to get re-elected as councillors.

In the 2001 Queen's Birthday Honours, McKendry was appointed a Companion of the Queen's Service Order for public services.

Other activities
In 1962, McKendry competed in the Mobilgas Economy Run, a car race from Nelson to Dunedin. He came in third in the 900 cc category. In 2006, he competed in a similar competition, the AA ENERGYWISE Rally, from Auckland to Wellington and return over four days.

McKendry was the principal of a car dealership in Blenheim.  He holds or has held positions on several bodies, including council member of the Nelson Marlborough Institute of Technology, trustee of the Marlborough Regional Development Trust,  and trustee of the Marlborough Electric Power Trust.

McKendry was an editorial team member responsible for "steering the project" on the production of a history for the 150th anniversary of Marlborough. McKendry Park in Blenheim, a former plum orchard in the Blenheim suburb of Springlands, is named in his honour.

McKendry keeps himself fit through playing golf. Age Concern New Zealand has profiled him as an example of older people living a healthy lifestyle.

References

1934 births
Living people
Mayors of Blenheim, New Zealand
Companions of the Queen's Service Order